The 1992 Azerbaijan Top League was the first season of the Azerbaijan Top League, since their independence from the USSR in August 1991, and was contested by 26 clubs. The Season took place between 3 May and 30 October 1992 and was won by Neftchi Baku, with six teams being relegated to the Azerbaijan First Division for the 1993 season. During the '92 season a win was awarded 2 points, a draw 1 and no points were awarded for a defeat.

Stadia and locations

Note: Table lists in alphabetical order.

First round

Group A

Table

Results

Group B

Table

Results

Second round

Championship group

Table

Results

Relegation group

Results

Season statistics

Top scorers

Clean sheets
 Most clean sheets: 20
Turan Tovuz
 Fewest clean sheets: 0
Şirvan Kürdəmir

References

External links
Azerbaijan 1992 RSSSF
APL Stats

Azerbaijan Premier League seasons
Azer
1
Azer
1